This list of highest awards in Scouting is an index to articles on notable awards given to youth members in the various national Scouting organizations. Most of these awards require a mastery of Scoutcraft and leadership and the performance of community service—only a small percentage of Scouts attain these awards. Many European nations do not have a rank system to avoid appearance of militarism.

Australia

Austria

Bangladesh

Belgium

Brazil

Canada

Republic of China (Taiwan)

Greece

Guatemala

Honduras

Hong Kong

Iceland

India
The highest awards are
 for the Cubs/Bulbuls section the "Golden Arrow Award"
 for the Scout/Guide section the Rashtrapati Scout/Guide Award
 for the Rover/Ranger section the Rashtrapati Rover/Ranger Award

Indonesia

Ireland

Japan

Korea

Malaysia

Netherlands

New Zealand

Pakistan

Panama

Philippines

Poland

Portugal

Singapore

Slovakia

Sri Lanka

South Africa

Sweden

Tanzania

Thailand

United Kingdom

United States

Venezuela

Zimbabwe

Scout associations

World Organization of the Scout Movement

World Federation of Independent Scouts

See also
Age groups in Scouting and Guiding
Association of Top Achiever Scouts

References

Scouting
Highest awards in Scouting
Scouting-related lists